Sophia Razumovskaya (1746–1803) was a Russian courtier. She served as maid of honour to empress Catherine the Great. She was married to Peter Kirillovich Razumovsky, and the mistress of Paul I of Russia prior to his marriage, with whom she had a son, Semen Velikiy (1772-1794).

Life
Sophia Razumovskaya was born to Stephan Fedorovich Ushakov and Anna Semenovna. She was appointed maid of honour to Catherine the Great. She married Mikhail Petrovich Czartoryski, but was early widowed. 

She participated in the social life of the court and was known for her vivacious life style. Pending the plans to have Grand Duke Paul married, there were concerns as to whether he was sexually capable to have an heir, and Sophia was asked to investigate his sexual function by seducing him.    She succeeded with her task and had a son with him, Semen Velikiy (1772-1794), whose upbringing was provided by the empress. 

Paul married in 1773, and in 1776, Sophia remarried count Peter Kirillovich Razumovskiy, son of field marshal Kirill Grigorievich Razumovsky. As her father-in-law protested and expressed his dislike of the marriage, it was likely not arranged, and the marriage is described as happy.

References 

 Издание вел. кн. Николая Михайловича. Русские портреты XVIII и XIX столетий. Т.3.Вып.3. № 110

1746 births
1803 deaths
Ladies-in-waiting from the Russian Empire
Mistresses of Paul of Russia
Burials at Lazarevskoe Cemetery (Saint Petersburg)